V. Balasundaram (1941/1942 – 7 December 2019) was an Indian politician who served as Member of the Legislative Assembly of Tamil Nadu. He was Mayor of Chennai for the year 1969–70, and was elected to the Tamil Nadu legislative assembly as a Dravida Munnetra Kazhagam candidate from Acharapakkam constituency in  1971 election.

He was later described as a "veteran Dalit leader", and became President of the Ambedkar Makkal Iyakkam (Ambedkar People's movement), a political movement in Tamil Nadu working for the upliftment of Dalits.

References 

1940s births
2019 deaths
Mayors of Chennai
Members of the Tamil Nadu Legislative Assembly
Dalit politicians
Dravida Munnetra Kazhagam politicians
Year of birth missing